Irvin Feld (April 19, 1918 – September 6, 1984) was a business entrepreneur who built a chain of record stores, promoted rock groups, produced concerts involving some of the biggest names in popular music. He was also the head of Ringling Bros. and Barnum & Bailey Circus and founder of Feld Entertainment. He was a music promoter who is credited with discovering Paul Anka.

Biography
Feld was born on April 19, 1918 in Hagerstown, Maryland to Russian-Jewish immigrants. Following high school, in 1938 he and his brother opened a drugstore on Seventh Street NW in Washington DC. Records proved big-sellers at the store. He later opened Super Music City record stores, and eventually branched out into producing both his own records and his own live concerts. After ten years as one of several national promoters for the Ringling Circus, Feld, along with his brother Israel Feld and Houston Judge Roy Hofheinz, bought the circus on November 11, 1967, for $8 million. In 1968, he began the Ringling Brothers and Barnum & Bailey Clown College. He sold the circus to Mattel in 1971 for $50 million in Mattel stock. He bought it back from Mattel in 1982 for $22.8 million.

Feld died on September 6, 1984, at age 66 in Venice, Florida.

Personal life and legacy
In 1946, he married Adele Feld. In 1958 she committed suicide. The circus passed to his son Kenneth Feld, who had joined the company in 1970. In 1987, he was inducted into the International Circus Hall of Fame.

References

1918 births
1984 deaths
American people of Russian-Jewish descent
Businesspeople from Maryland
Circus owners
Music promoters
People from Hagerstown, Maryland
Ringling Bros. and Barnum & Bailey Circus people
20th-century American businesspeople